A mudlark is a person who scavenges in river mud for items of value, especially in London during the late 18th and 19th centuries.

Mudlark may also refer to:

Arts and entertainment
 The Mudlark, a 1950 British film
 The Mudlarks, an English pop vocal group active in the late 1950s and early 1960s
 Mudlark (album), Leo Kottke's fourth album
 Mudlark (company), an English gamification company
 Girl with Ruffled Hair (The Mudlark), a portrait by Vincent van Gogh

Other uses
 Mudlark (bird), a bird (Grallina cyanoleuca)
 Mudlark, a model of Penton off-road motorcycle